Davenport is a surname and may refer to:

A
 Abraham Davenport (1715–1789), American politician
 A'keria C. Davenport (born 1988), American drag queen
 Alan Garnett Davenport (1932–2009), Canadian wind engineer
 Alice Davenport (1864–1936), American film actress
 Arthur Davenport (disambiguation)
 Ashley Davenport (1794–1874), New York state senator

B
 Bernard Davenport (born c. 1939), Irish ambassador
 Bill Davenport (1906–2001), American footballer

C
 Calum Davenport (born 1983), English footballer
 Charles Davenport (1866–1944), American biologist and eugenicist
 Christopher Davenport (1598–1680), English Catholic theologian
 Claire Davenport (1933–2002), English actress
 Clay Davenport, American baseball statistician
 Clyde Davenport (born 1921), American folk musician

D
 Derrick Davenport (born 1978), American male model
 Dorothy Davenport (1895–1977), American actress, screenwriter and film director
 Doris Davenport (1917–1980), American actress

E
 Ed. J. Davenport (1899–1953), Los Angeles City Council member
 Edward Davenport (fraudster) (1966–) also known as "(Lord) Fast Eddie", convicted English fraudster and property developer
 Edward Loomis Davenport (1816–1877), American actor
 Emily Davenport, American inventor

F
 Fanny Davenport (1850–1898), English-born American stage actress
 Francis William Davenport (1847–1925), English composer and music professor
 Franklin Davenport (1755–1832), American politician
 Frederick M. Davenport (1866–1956), American politician

G
 Gail Davenport (born 1949), American politician
 George Davenport (1783–1845), American frontiersman, trader and US Army colonel; Davenport, Iowa, was named in his honor
 George Davenport (1860-1902), English first-class cricketer
 Gertrude Crotty Davenport (1866–1946), American biologist and eugenicist
 Glorianna Davenport, documentary filmmaker and researcher
 Guy Davenport (1927–2005), American writer, intellectual, and teacher

H
 Harold Davenport (1907–1969), British mathematician
 Harriett Davenport (1899–1953), Los Angeles City Council member
 Harry Davenport (1866–1949), American film actor
 Harry J. Davenport (1902–1977), American politician
 Harry Davenport (1833–1895), English politician
 Herbert J. Davenport (1861–1931), American economist
 Hester Davenport (1642–1717), English stage actress 
 Homer Davenport (1867–1912), American political cartoonist
 Honey Davenport (born 1985), American drag queen
 Hugh Bromley-Davenport (1870–1954), English cricketer

I
 Ian Davenport (born 1960), English painter
 Ira Davenport (politician) (1841–1904), American politician
 Ira Davenport (athlete) (1887–1941), American athlete and football player
 Isaiah Davenport (1784–1827), American master builder

J
 Jack Davenport (born 1973),  British actor
 Jack A. Davenport (1931–1951), United States Marine Medal of Honor recipient
 James Davenport (clergyman) (1716–1757), American clergyman
 James Davenport (Connecticut congressman) (1756–1797), American lawyer and politician
 James C. Davenport (born 1938), American physicist
 James H. Davenport (born 1953), British computer scientist and mathematician
 Jean Margaret Davenport (1829–1903), Anglo-American actress
 Jessica Davenport (born 1985), American basketball player
 Jim Davenport (1933–2016), former American baseball player and manager
 John Davenport (minister) (1597–1670), Puritan clergyman and one of the founders of New Haven, Connecticut 
 John Davenport (orientalist) (1789 – 1877), British orientalist and writer
 Julién Davenport (born 1995), American football player

K
 Kennedy Davenport, a contestant on RuPaul's Drag Race
 Kenny Davenport (1862–1908), English footballer
 Kiana Davenport, American-Hawaiian author
 Kim Davenport (born 1955), American professional pool player

L
 Lindsay Davenport (born 1976), American female professional tennis player
 Louis Davenport (1869–1951), American businessman
 Lucy Davenport, British actress

M
 Madison Davenport (born 1996), American actress and singer
 Marcia Davenport (1903–1996), American author and music critic
 Marcus Davenport (born 1996), American football player
 Marmaduke Davenport, pseudonym for British confidence trickster Alexander Day
 Mike Davenport (born 1968), American musician
 Milla Davenport (1871–1936), stage and film actress
 Millia Davenport (1895–1992), American costumer, theater designer, and scholar
 Miriam Davenport (1915–1999), American painter and sculptor

N
 Najeh Davenport (born 1979), American footballer
 N'Dea Davenport (born 1966), American R&B/soul singer/songwriter
 Nigel Davenport (1928–2013), British actor

P
 Paul Davenport (born 1946), 9th president of the University of Western Ontario
 Peter Davenport (born 1961), former English professional footballer

R
 Richard Davenport-Hines (born 1953), British writer
 Robert Davenport (fl. 1623–1639), English dramatist
 Robert Davenport (Royal Navy officer) (1882–1965), British admiral
 Robert Davenport (Australian politician) (1816–1896), pioneer of South Australia, brother of Samuel
 Ross Davenport (born 1984), British swimmer
 Roy M. Davenport (1909–1987), United States Navy Rear Admiral, 5-time recipient of the Navy Cross
 Russell Davenport (1899–1954), American publisher and writer

S
 Samuel Davenport (disambiguation)
 Samuel Davenport (1818–1906), South Australian pioneer and parliamentarian
 Samuel Arza Davenport (1834–1911), American politician
 Stanley Woodward Davenport (1861–1921), American politician
 Stuart Davenport (born 1962), New Zealand squash player
 Sahara Davenport (1984–2012), a past contestant of Rupaul's Drag Race

T
 Thomas Davenport (inventor) (1802–1851), blacksmith from Vermont, US who was an inventor of DC electric motors
 Thomas Davenport (congressman) (died 1838), US representative from Virginia
 Thomas H. Davenport (born 1954), American academic

W
 Wilbur Davenport (1920–2003), American communications engineer and MIT professor
 Wallace Davenport (1925–2004), American jazz trumpeter
 Willie Davenport (1943–2002), American athlete
 William Davenport (filmmaker) (born 1960), filmmaker and autism activist
 William Davenport (scientist) (1772–1824), Irish academic and  clergyman
 William Bromley-Davenport (1821–1884), British MP for Warwickshire North
 William Bromley-Davenport (1862–1949), British soldier, footballer and Conservative politician
 Wink Davenport (born 1942), American former volleyball player

Z
 Zavion Michael Davenport (1985-2020), American drag queen known as Chi Chi DeVayne

Brothers 
 Davenport Brothers (Ira Erastus and William Henry), noted frauds of spiritualism

See also
 Davenport (disambiguation)
 Bromley-Davenport
 Davenport, fictional family from the British television soap Family Affairs

English-language surnames